The Round Valley Unified School District (RVUSD) is an Arizona school district comprising five schools in Apache County, Arizona. The towns that house the schools of RVUSD include Eagar and Springerville, Arizona. As of 2006, RVUSD has 1610 students. The mascot for the entire school system is the Elks.

History
Schools in Springerville and Eagar were founded in 1880 and 1896, respectively. In 1969, the Springerville, Eagar, Vernon, Nutrioso, Greer, and Colter schools consolidated with each other to form the Round Valley Unified School District.

Previously Blue School District of Blue was a K-8 school, so Round Valley High School in Eagar served Blue for high school, with some students living with relatives in Eagar and some traveling to and from Eagar via school bus.

Schools
Round Valley Elementary School
Round Valley Ensphere
Round Valley Middle School
Round Valley High School

References

External links

Data on RVUSD

School districts in Apache County, Arizona
School districts established in 1969
1969 establishments in Arizona
Education in Greenlee County, Arizona